Kyzyl-Tash (Qıźıltaş) is a rural locality (a village) in Gafurovsky Selsoviet, Tuymazinsky District, Bashkortostan, Russia. The population was 26 as of 2010. There is 1 street.

Geography 
Kyzyl-Tash is located 17 km southeast of Tuymazy (the district's administrative centre) by road. Vozdvizhenka is the nearest rural locality.

References 

Rural localities in Tuymazinsky District